Karl Skala (3 February 1924 – 31 December 2006) was an Austrian poet.

He started to write in 1943, while in Russia during the war. He earned recognition with the poem "Ein guter Kamerad", which he had written for his fallen friend and comrade Hannes.
His first book of poetry, Feierabend-Andacht, was published in 1956. It was followed by five more books. During his lifetime, Karl received many awards, including Das Goldene Ehrenzeichen für Verdienste um das Bundesland Steiermark. Many of his poems were put to music. He was often invited to other countries and traveled extensively.

Selection of works

Volumes of poetry 
 Feierabend-Andacht (After Work Devotions) (1956)
 ... und ringsum ist Heimat (... and All Around is Home) (1957)
 Wie 's holt so geht (As it Goes) (1966)
 Gefährte Mensch und Zeitgenoss' (Companion Man and Contemporary) (1968)
 Unterwegs durch Zeit und Leben (On the Way Through Time and Life) (1976)
 Späte Ernte (Late Harvest) (1989)

Sources
 

External links
 
 Karl Skala at Music Information Center Austria

1924 births
2006 deaths
20th-century Austrian poets
Austrian male poets
German-language poets
20th-century Austrian male writers